Roland Viau (born February 6, 1954) is a Canadian academic and writer from Quebec. An ethnologist who teaches in the department of anthropology at the Université de Montréal, he is a two-time winner the Governor General's Award for French-language non-fiction at the 1997 Governor General's Awards for Enfants du néant et mangeurs d'âmes – Guerre, culture et société en Iroquoisie ancienne and at the 2016 Governor General's Awards for Amerindia : essais d'ethnohistoire autochtone.

References

21st-century Canadian male writers
21st-century Canadian non-fiction writers
Canadian non-fiction writers in French
Canadian anthropologists
Canadian ethnologists
Université Laval alumni
Academic staff of the Université de Montréal
Living people
People from Salaberry-de-Valleyfield
Governor General's Award-winning non-fiction writers
1954 births
Canadian male non-fiction writers